Pleurotomella enderbyensis is a species of sea snail, a marine gastropod mollusk in the family Raphitomidae.

Description
The shell grows to a length of  12 mm

Distribution
This species occurs in the Antarctic waters in the Weddell Sea.

References

 Engl, W. (2012). Shells of Antarctica. Hackenheim: Conchbooks. 402 pp

External links
 Kantor Y.I., Harasewych M.G. & Puillandre N. (2016). A critical review of Antarctic Conoidea (Neogastropoda). Molluscan Research. 36(3): 153-206
 Biolib.cz: Pleurotomella enderbyensis
 
  Griffiths, H.J.; Linse, K.; Crame, J.A. (2003). SOMBASE - Southern Ocean mollusc database: a tool for biogeographic analysis in diversity and evolution. Organisms Diversity and Evolution. 3: 207-213

enderbyensis
Gastropods described in 1958